John Francis Dillon (March 6, 1866 – October 9, 1927) was one of the first members of the United States Federal Radio Commission, the forerunner of the Federal Communications Commission.

Biography
Dillon was born in Bellevue, Ohio. He served in the Signal Corps of the U.S. Army during the Spanish–American War and was master electrician in the Signal Corps from 1904 to 1912. In 1912, he was appointed a Radio Inspector for the Department of Commerce, which had just been given authority over radio by the Radio Act of 1912. Dillon stayed until the U.S. entered World War I in 1917, at which point he re-entered the signal Corps. He ultimately attained the rank of lieutenant colonel. After the war, Dillon re-joined the Radio Division and in 1923 was made Radio Supervisor for the 6th district, in San Francisco. In 1927, he was appointed to the Federal Radio Commission as commissioner from the Fifth Zone. He was generally considered the most knowledgeable about radio of the early commissioners, but he died just months after taking office. He was replaced on the commission by Harold LaFount.

1866 births
1927 deaths
People from Bellevue, Ohio
United States Army officers
American military personnel of the Spanish–American War
United States Army personnel of World War I
Members of the Federal Radio Commission